The Habsburg monarchy, also known as the Danubian monarchy, or Habsburg Empire, was the collection of empires, kingdoms, duchies, counties and other polities that were ruled by the House of Habsburg, especially the dynasty's Austrian branch.

The history of the Habsburg monarchy can be traced back to the election of Rudolf I as King of Germany in 1273 and his acquisition of the Duchy of Austria for the Habsburg in 1282. In 1482, Maximilian I acquired the Netherlands through marriage. Both realms passed to his grandson and successor, Charles V, who also inherited the Spanish throne and its colonial possessions, and thus came to rule the Habsburg empire at its greatest territorial extent. The abdication of Charles V in 1556 led to a division within the dynasty between his son Philip II of Spain and his brother Ferdinand I, who had served as his lieutenant and the elected king of Hungary and Bohemia. The Spanish branch (which held all of Iberia, the Netherlands, Burgundy, and lands in Italy) became extinct in 1700. The Austrian branch (which ruled the Holy Roman Empire, Hungary, Bohemia and various other lands) was itself split into different branches in 1564 but reunited 101 years later.

The Habsburg monarchy was a personal union of crowns, with no uniform laws or shared institutions other than the Habsburg court itself; the territorial possessions of the monarchy were thus united only by virtue of a common monarch. The Habsburg realms were unified in 1804 with the formation of the Austrian Empire and later split in two with the Austro-Hungarian Compromise of 1867. The monarchy began to fracture in the face of inevitable defeat during the final years of World War I and ultimately disbanded with the proclamation of the Republic of German-Austria and the First Hungarian Republic in late 1918.

In historiography, the terms "Austria" or "Austrians" are frequently used as shorthand for the Habsburg monarchy since the 18th century. From 1438 to 1806, the rulers of the House of Habsburg almost continuously reigned as Holy Roman Emperors. However, the realms of the Holy Roman Empire were mostly self-governing and are thus not considered to have been part of the Habsburg monarchy. Hence, the Habsburg monarchy (of the Austrian branch) is often called "Austria" by metonymy. Around 1700, the Latin term monarchia austriaca came into use as a term of convenience. Within the empire alone, the vast possessions included the original hereditary lands, the Erblande, from before 1526; the lands of the Bohemian crown; the formerly Spanish Netherlands from 1714 until 1794; and some fiefs in Imperial Italy. Outside the empire, they encompassed all the lands of the crown of Hungary as well as conquests made at the expense of the Ottoman Empire. The dynastic capital was Vienna, except from 1583 to 1611, when it was in Prague.

Origins and expansion

The first Habsburg who can be reliably traced was Radbot of Klettgau, who was born in the late 10th century; the family name originated with Habsburg Castle, in present-day Switzerland, which was built by Radbot. After 1279, the Habsburgs came to rule in the Duchy of Austria, which was part of the elective Kingdom of Germany within the Holy Roman Empire. King Rudolf I of Germany of the Habsburg family assigned the Duchy of Austria to his sons at the Diet of Augsburg (1282), thus establishing the "Austrian hereditary lands". From that moment, the Habsburg dynasty was also known as the House of Austria. Between 1438 and 1806, with few exceptions, the Habsburg Archduke of Austria was elected as Holy Roman Emperor.

The Habsburgs grew to European prominence as a result of the dynastic policy pursued by Maximilian I, Holy Roman Emperor. Maximilian married Mary of Burgundy, thus bringing the Burgundian Netherlands into the Habsburg possessions. Their son, Philip the Handsome, married Joanna the Mad of Spain (daughter of Ferdinand II of Aragon and Isabella of Castile). Charles V, Holy Roman Emperor, the son of Philip and Joanna, inherited the Habsburg Netherlands in 1506, Habsburg Spain and its territories in 1516, and Habsburg Austria in 1519.

At this point, the Habsburg possessions were so vast that Charles V was constantly travelling throughout his dominions and therefore needed deputies and regents, such as Isabella of Portugal in Spain and Margaret of Austria in the Low Countries, to govern his various realms. At the Diet of Worms in 1521, Emperor Charles V came to terms with his younger brother Ferdinand. According to the Habsburg compact of Worms (1521), confirmed a year later in Brussels, Ferdinand was made Archduke, as a regent of Charles V in the Austrian hereditary lands.

Following the death of Louis II of Hungary in the Battle of Mohács against the Ottoman Turks, Archduke Ferdinand (who was his brother-in-law by virtue of an adoption treaty signed by Maximilian and Vladislaus II, Louis's father at the First Congress of Vienna) was also elected the next King of Bohemia and Hungary in 1526. Bohemia and Hungary became hereditary Habsburg domains only in the 17th century: Following victory in the Battle of White Mountain (1620) over the Bohemian rebels, Ferdinand II promulgated a Renewed Constitution (1627) that established hereditary succession over Bohemia. Following the Battle of Mohács (1687), in which Leopold I reconquered almost all of Hungary from the Ottoman Turks, the emperor held a diet in Pressburg to establish hereditary succession in the Hungarian kingdom.

Charles V divided the House in 1556 by ceding Austria along with the Imperial crown to Ferdinand (as decided at the Imperial election, 1531), and the Spanish empire to his son Philip. The Spanish branch (which also held the Netherlands, the Kingdom of Portugal between 1580 and 1640, and the Mezzogiorno of Italy) became extinct in 1700. The Austrian branch (which also ruled the Holy Roman Empire, Hungary and Bohemia) was itself divided between different branches of the family from 1564 until 1665, but thereafter it remained a single personal union.

Names
 Habsburg monarchy (German Habsburgermonarchie): this is an unofficial umbrella term, very frequently used, but was not an official name.
 Austrian monarchy came into use around 1700 as a term of convenience for the Habsburg territories.
 "Danubian monarchy" was an unofficial name often used contemporaneously.
 "Dual monarchy" referred to the combination of the Duchy of Austria and the Kingdom of Hungary, two states under one crowned ruler.
 Austrian Empire: This was the official name of the new Habsburg empire created in 1804, after the end of the Holy Roman Empire. The English word empire refers to a territory ruled by an emperor, and not to a "widespreading domain".
 Austria-Hungary, 1867–1918: This name was commonly used in international relations, although the official name was Austro-Hungarian Monarchy.
 Crownlands or crown lands (Kronländer) (1849–1918): This is the name of all the individual parts of the Austrian Empire (1849–1867), and then of Austria-Hungary from 1867 on. The Kingdom of Hungary (more exactly the Lands of the Hungarian Crown) was not considered a "crownland" anymore after the establishment of Austria-Hungary in 1867, so that the "crownlands" became identical with what was called the Kingdoms and Lands represented in the Imperial Council (Die im Reichsrate vertretenen Königreiche und Länder).
 The Hungarian parts of the empire were called "Lands of the Crown of Saint Stephen" or "Lands of Holy (St.) Stephen's Crown" (Länder der Heiligen Stephans Krone). The Bohemian (Czech) Lands were called "Lands of the St. Wenceslaus' Crown" (Länder der Wenzels-Krone).

Names of some smaller territories:
 Present-day Austria is a semi-federal republic of nine states (Bundesländer): Lower Austria, Upper Austria, Tyrol, Styria, Salzburg, Carinthia, Vorarlberg, Burgenland and the capital city, Vienna.
 Burgenland came to Austria in 1921 from Hungary.
 Salzburg finally became Austrian in 1816 after the Napoleonic wars; before that it was ruled by the prince-archbishops of Salzburg as a sovereign territory.
 Vienna, Austria's capital, became a state on 1 January 1922, having been the imperial residence and capital of the Austrian Empire (Reichshaupt und Residenzstadt Wien) for centuries.
 Austria, historically, was split into "Austria above the Enns" and "Austria below the Enns" (the Enns river is the state-border between Upper- and Lower Austria). Upper Austria was enlarged after the Treaty of Teschen (1779) following the "War of the Bavarian Succession" by the so-called Innviertel ("Inn Quarter"), formerly part of Bavaria.
 Hereditary Lands (Erblande or Erbländer; mostly used Österreichische Erblande) or German Hereditary Lands (in the Austrian monarchy) or Austrian Hereditary Lands (Middle Ages – 1849/1918): In a narrower sense these were the "original" Habsburg territories, principally Austria (Oesterreich), Styria (Steiermark), Carinthia (Kaernten), Carniola (Krain), Tyrol (Tirol) and Vorarlberg. In a wider sense the Lands of the Bohemian Crown were also included (from 1526; definitively from 1620/27) in the Hereditary Lands. The term was replaced by the term "Crownlands" (see above) in the 1849 March Constitution, but it was also used afterwards. The Erblande also included many small territories that were principalities, duchies or counties in other parts of the Holy Roman Empire.

Territories

The territories ruled of the Austrian monarchy changed over the centuries, but the core always consisted of four blocs:
 The Hereditary Lands, which covered most of the modern states of Austria and Slovenia, as well as territories in northeastern Italy and (before 1797) southwestern Germany. To these were added in 1779 the Inn Quarter of Bavaria and in 1803 the Bishoprics of Trent and Brixen. The Napoleonic Wars caused disruptions where many parts of the Hereditary lands were lost, but all these, along with the former Archbishopric of Salzburg, which had previously been temporarily annexed between 1805 and 1809, were recovered at the peace in 1815, with the exception of the Vorlande. The Hereditary provinces included:
 Archduchy of Austria
 Upper Austria
 Lower Austria
 Inner Austria
 Duchy of Styria
 Duchy of Carinthia
 Duchy of Carniola
 The Adriatic port of Trieste
 Margraviate of Istria (although much of Istria was Venetian territory until 1797)
 Princely County of Gorizia and Gradisca
 County of Tyrol (although the Bishoprics of Trent and Brixen dominated what would become the South Tyrol before 1803
 Further Austria, mostly ruled jointly with Tyrol.
 Vorarlberg (actually a collection of provinces, only united in the 19th century)
 The Vorlande, a group of territories in Breisgau and elsewhere in southwestern Germany lost in 1801 (although the Alsatian territories (Sundgau) which had formed a part of it had been lost as early as 1648)
 Grand Duchy of Salzburg (only after 1805)
 The Lands of the Bohemian Crown. The Bohemian Diet elected Ferdinand, later Holy Roman Emperor Ferdinand I, as king in 1526. Initially consisting of the five lands:
 Kingdom of Bohemia
 Margraviate of Moravia
 Silesia, Most of Silesia was conquered by Prussia in 1740–1742 and the remnants which stayed under Habsburg sovereignty were ruled as Duchy of Upper and Lower Silesia (Austrian Silesia).
 Lusatia, was ceded to Saxony in 1635.
 Upper Lusatia
 Lower Lusatia
 The Kingdom of Hungary – two-thirds of the former territory that was administered by the medieval Kingdom of Hungary was conquered by the Ottoman Empire and the Princes of vassal Ottoman Transylvania, while the Habsburg administration was restricted to the western and northern territories of the former kingdom, which remained to be officially referred as the Kingdom of Hungary. In 1699, at the end of the Ottoman-Habsburg wars, one part of the territories that were administered by the former medieval Kingdom of Hungary came under Habsburg administration, with some other areas being picked up in 1718 (some of the territories that were part of medieval kingdom, notably those in the south of the Sava and Danube rivers, remained under Ottoman administration).
 Kingdom of Croatia

Over the course of its history, other lands were, at times, under Austrian Habsburg rule (some of these territories were secundogenitures, i.e. ruled by other lines of Habsburg dynasty):
 Serbia occupation (1686–1691)
 Kingdom of Slavonia (1699–1868)
 Grand Principality of Transylvania, between 1699 (Treaty of Karlowitz) and 1867 (Ausgleich)
 Austrian Netherlands, consisting of most of modern Belgium and Luxembourg (1713–1792)
 Duchy of Milan (1713–1797)
 Duchy of Mantua (1713–1797)
 Kingdom of Naples (1713–1735)
 Kingdom of Sardinia (1713–1720)
 Kingdom of Serbia (1718–1739)
 Banat of Temeswar (1718–1778)
 Banat of Craiova (1718–1739 de facto, 1716–1737)
 Kingdom of Sicily (1720–1735)
 Duchy of Parma (1735–1748)
 Kingdom of Galicia and Lodomeria, in modern Poland and Ukraine (1772–1918)
 Duchy of Bukovina (1774–1918)
 Serbia occupation (1788–1792)
 New Galicia, the Polish lands, including Kraków, taken in the Third Partition (1795–1809)
 Venetia (1797–1805)
 Kingdom of Dalmatia (1797–1805, 1814–1918)
 Kingdom of Lombardy–Venetia (1814–1866)
 Kraków, which was incorporated into Galicia (1846–1918)
 Serbian Vojvodina (1848–1849) de facto entity, officially unrecognized
 Voivodeship of Serbia and Banat of Temeschwar (1849–1860)
 Kingdom of Croatia-Slavonia (1868–1918)
 Sanjak of Novi Pazar occupation (1878–1908)
 Austro-Hungarian rule in Bosnia and Herzegovina (1878–1918)

The boundaries of some of these territories varied over the period indicated, and others were ruled by a subordinate (secundogeniture) Habsburg line. The Habsburgs also held the title of Holy Roman Emperor between 1438 and 1740, and again from 1745 to 1806.

Characteristics

Within the early modern Habsburg monarchy, each entity was governed according to its own particular customs. Until the mid 17th century, not all of the provinces were even necessarily ruled by the same person—junior members of the family often ruled portions of the Hereditary Lands as private apanages. Serious attempts at centralization began under Maria Theresa and especially her son Joseph II in the mid to late 18th century, but many of these were abandoned following large scale resistance to Joseph's more radical reform attempts, although a more cautious policy of centralization continued during the revolutionary period and the Metternichian period that followed.

Another attempt at centralization began in 1849 following the suppression of the various revolutions of 1848. For the first time, ministers tried to transform the monarchy into a centralized bureaucratic state ruled from Vienna. The Kingdom of Hungary was placed under martial law, being divided into a series of military districts, the centralized neo-absolutism tried to as well to nullify Hungary's constitution and Diet. Following the Habsburg defeats in the Wars of 1859 and 1866, these policies were step by step abandoned.

After experimentation in the early 1860s, the famous Austro-Hungarian Compromise of 1867 was arrived at, by which the so-called dual monarchy of Austria-Hungary was set up. In this system, the Kingdom of Hungary ("Lands of the Holy Hungarian Crown of St. Stephen.") was an equal sovereign with only a personal union and a joint foreign and military policy connecting it to the other Habsburg lands. Although the non-Hungarian Habsburg lands were referred to as "Austria", received their own central parliament (the Reichsrat, or Imperial Council) and ministries, as their official name – the "Kingdoms and Lands Represented in the Imperial Council". When Bosnia and Herzegovina was annexed (after a long period of occupation and administration), it was not incorporated into either half of the monarchy. Instead, it was governed by the joint Ministry of Finance.

During the dissolution of Austria-Hungary, the nation collapsed under the weight of the various ethnic independence movements that came to the fore with its defeat in World War I. After its dissolution, the new republics of Austria (the German-Austrian territories of the Hereditary lands) and the First Hungarian Republic were created. In the peace settlement that followed, significant territories were ceded to Romania and Italy and the remainder of the monarchy's territory was shared out among the new states of Poland, Kingdom of Serbs, Croats and Slovenes (later Yugoslavia), and Czechoslovakia.

Other lines
A junior line ruled over the Grand Duchy of Tuscany between 1765 and 1801, and again from 1814 to 1859. While exiled from Tuscany, this line ruled at Salzburg from 1803 to 1805, and in Grand Duchy of Würzburg from 1805 to 1814. Another line ruled the Duchy of Modena from 1814 to 1859, while Empress Marie Louise, Napoleon's second wife and the daughter of Austrian Emperor Francis, ruled over the Duchy of Parma between 1814 and 1847. Also, the Second Mexican Empire, from 1863 to 1867, was headed by Maximilian I of Mexico, the brother of Emperor Franz Josef of Austria.

Rulers 1508–1918

The so-called "Habsburg monarchs" or "Habsburg emperors" held many different titles and ruled each kingdom separately through a personal union.

 Frederick III (1452–1493)
 Maximilian I (1493–1519)
 Charles V (1519–1556)
 Ferdinand I (1556–1564)
 Maximilian II (1564–1576)
 Rudolf II (1576–1612)
 Matthias (1612–1619)
 Ferdinand II (1619–1637)
 Ferdinand III (1637–1657)
 Leopold I (1657–1705)
 Joseph I (1705–1711)
 Charles VI (1711–1740)
 Maria Theresa (1740–1780) (German: Maria Theresia)

Habsburg-Lorraine
 Joseph II (1780–1790), known as "the great Reformer"
 Leopold II (1790–1792), from 1765 to 1790 "Grandduke of Tuscany"
 Francis II (1792–1835), correctly written "Franz" (became Emperor Francis I of Austria in 1804, at which point numbering starts anew)
 Ferdinand I (1835–1848), known as "Ferdinand the Good" German: "Ferdinand der Gütige"
 Francis Joseph I (1848–1916), brother of Emperor Maximilian I of Mexico
 Charles I (1916–1918), last reigning monarch of Austria-Hungary
 Otto von Habsburg, former head of the House of Habsburg-Lorraine and MEP for Germany (1979–1999)
 Karl von Habsburg, current head of the House of Habsburg-Lorraine and MEP for Austria (1996–1999)

Family tree
 Habsburg family tree

In literature
The most famous memoir on the decline of the Habsburg Empire is Stefan Zweig's The World of Yesterday.

See also 
 Habsburg Myth
 Universal monarchy

References

Citations

Sources

Further reading

 
 
 
 
 Fichtner, Paula Sutter (2003). The Habsburg Monarchy, 1490–1848: Attributes of Empire, Palgrave Macmillan.
 Henderson, Nicholas. "Joseph II" History Today (Sept 1955) 5#9 pp. 613–621.
 
 
 Judson, Pieter M. The Habsburg Empire: A New History (2016) excerpt
 Kann, Robert A. A History of the Habsburg Empire: 1526–1918 (University of California Press, 1974) online
 Lieven, Dominic. Empire: The Russian empire and its rivals (Yale University Press, 2002), comparisons with Russian, British, & Ottoman empires.
 
 McCagg, Jr., William O (1989). A History of the Habsburg Jews, 1670–1918 (Indiana University Press.
 Mitchell, A. Wess (2018). The Grand Strategy of the Habsburg Empire. Princeton University Press.
 Oakes, Elizabeth and Eric Roman (2003). Austria-Hungary and the Successor States: A Reference Guide from the Renaissance to the Present.
 
 Stone, Norman. "The Last Days of the Habsburg  Monarchy," History Today (Aug 1968), Vol. 18 Issue 8, pp. 551–560; online

External links
 Habsburg in an email discussion list dealing with the culture and history of the Habsburg Monarchy and its successor states in central Europe since 1500, with discussions, syllabi, book reviews, queries, conferences; edited daily by scholars since 1994.

 
Former empires in Europe
Former monarchies of Europe
.
States and territories established in 1526
1526 establishments in the Holy Roman Empire
16th-century establishments in Europe
States and territories disestablished in 1804
1804 disestablishments in the Holy Roman Empire
16th century in Europe
17th century in Europe
18th century in Europe
19th century in Europe
Monarchy
Christian states
Tributary states of the Ottoman Empire